Shamulzayi District is a district of Zabul province in southern Afghanistan.

Demographics 
It has a population of about 25,100 as of 2013. The district is mostly populated by the Tokhi tribe of Ghilji Pashtuns.

See also 
Districts of Afghanistan

References 

Districts of Zabul Province